A monthly nurse is a woman who looks after a mother and her baby during the postpartum or postnatal period. The phrase is now largely obsolete, but the job continues under other names and conditions worldwide.

In the past, it was customary for women to rest in bed or at home for a prolonged period after childbirth. Typically, their female relatives, such as their mother or mother-in-law, would provide care, or wealthy families would hire a monthly nurse. This period, known as confinement or lying-in, would end with the mother's reintroduction to the community during a Christian ceremony called the churching of women. In 18th and 19th century England, the term "monthly nurse" was prevalent since the nurse would usually stay with the patient for four weeks. However, the term "monthly" is not entirely accurate since there was no fixed time for the nurse's services to be provided or to end, but it was entirely dependent on the arrangement.

The job still exists, although now it might be described as "postnatal doula," "maternity nurse," or "newborn care specialist," all specialist sorts of nannies. A modern version of this rest period has evolved to give maximum support to the new mother, especially if she is recovering from a difficult labor and delivery. It is trendy in China and its diaspora, where postpartum confinement is known as "sitting the month." These workers can visit the new mother's home daily or live in it for a month. Conversely, they may work in a central setting, where the new mothers come after they leave the hospital. In Korea, these workers are called Sanhujorisa, and the centers started up in the late 1990s.

History

Historically, the delivery of babies and care of the mothers was inherited from mother to daughter, with the daughter spending many years as the pupil or apprentice. The Church supported that by a system of licensing, which required midwives to swear to some rules regarding contraception, abortion, and concealment of births and also to deliver the newborn infants for baptism or, in extreme cases, to perform the ceremony themselves.

In the mid-18th century, the legal status of midwives was withdrawn, and the surgeon's responsibility for delivery was vested. This raised the question of who would take care of the baby after birth. It was generally thought that the best person to look after her baby was a woman who had had one herself. Often, the task was allotted to motherly or grandmotherly hands, and the monthly nurse originated from that requirement for postnatal care. The Nursing Record reported that "there was little or no attempt at knowledge or instruction, and we know as a fact that ignorance, prejudice and neglect resulted in a goodly crop of errors, wrongs, and woes as regards the hapless infant."

The Nursing Record reported that "nurses who attend the 'artisan' classes in their confinements as a rule pay a visit daily for ten days and then give up the case, as few working class mothers can afford to lie up for longer."

A monthly nurse could earn more than a midwife, as the monthly nurse was employed for periods between 10 days and often much longer and might attend to several women part-time. She often "lived in." The midwife's only duty was perceived as "being trained to assist the parturient  woman while nature does her own work and able to call upon a surgeon who could step in where nature fails and skill and science are required." Many certified midwives transferred to the ranks of monthly nurses to benefit from an increased income.

Certification
Although 'registration' was not available for women to act as midwives or monthly nurses, a system of 'certification' existed in the late 19th century and continued into the early 20th century. To qualify, a candidate monthly nurse would attend a course in a lying-in hospital for four or five weeks and a midwife for up to three months. As a rule, the prospective midwives and monthly nurses paid their own charges in respect of hospital expenses and then entered practice on their own responsibility. In 1893, Miss Gosling reported that "although the certificated monthly nurse could be relied upon as being trustworthy and efficient, there were a number of women who attend lectures for a short time and through one cause or another fail to pass their examination and obtain a certificate nevertheless enter a 'Nurses Home' or open one for themselves."

As might be expected, rogue institutions issued certificates and diplomas "for a price." Another reporting on a lying in hospital and signing herself a 'victim of the system' said that she "witnessed the first phase of the system which turns out yearly hundreds of midwives and monthly nurses on an unsuspecting public. These would be nurses represented almost every grade of the lower classes and every degree of lack of education, and one woman, I remember could not write. Personally, I found many to be dishonest, untruthful, indescribably dirty in their habits and persons, utterly unprincipled, shockingly coarse and deficient intelligence, and with not the faintest idea of discipline."

United Kingdom Reform and the 1902 Act
In the late 19th century, reformers were calling not only for registration and recognition of the profession of a midwife but also for the two functions of midwife and monthly nurse to be amalgamated: "The work of midwives lies, for the most part, amongst the poor and the poor lying-in woman needs not only to be delivered, but to be visited for some ten days subsequent to her confinement." The registration of midwives was opposed by members of the House of Lords and Parliament in the United Kingdom for many years, who argued that the delivery of infants was the responsibility of trained doctors and to allow women to do the job, even in straightforward cases, would take away doctors' income. It was not until the Midwives Act of 1902, following 12 years of representation by women, that midwives were "registered," but it would still take several years for it to be accepted. The professional training and formal qualification of midwives, and eventually, the postnatal care offered by the National Health Service, saw the end of the monthly nurse.

See also
Wet nurse
Canadian Mothercraft Society
kraamzorg

Further reading
 Churchill, Fleetwood. On the Theory and Practice of Midwifery. Philadelphia: Blanchard, 1860. "Qualifications and Duties of the Monthly Nurse" p..629-648 GBooks
 Adams, Annmarie. Architecture in the Family Way: Doctors, Houses, and Women, 1870-1900. McGill-Queen's/Hannah Institute studies in the history of medicine, health, and society, v. 4. Montreal: McGill-Queen's University Press, 2001. p. 112-13 
 The many articles and letters published in the Nursing Record between 1860 and 1930
"The monthly nurse: her origin, rise, and progress". May 21, 1891. The Nursing Record. Marian Humfrey, member of Royal British Nurses' Association

Nursing specialties
Midwifery
Gendered occupations
Child care
Women's health
Archaic English words and phrases
Childbirth